The 1945–46 Connecticut Huskies men's basketball team represented University of Connecticut in the 1945–46 collegiate men's basketball season. The Huskies completed the season with an 11–6 overall record. The Huskies were members of the New England Conference, where they ended the season with a 4–2 record. The Huskies played their home games at Hawley Armory in Storrs, Connecticut, and were led by first-year head coach Blair Gullion.

Schedule 

|-
!colspan=12 style=""| Regular Season

Schedule Source:

References 

UConn Huskies men's basketball seasons
Connecticut
1945 in sports in Connecticut
1946 in sports in Connecticut